Santiago Eximeno (Madrid, 1973) is a Spanish novelist.

Eximeno has published the novels Condenados (2011) and Asura (2004), and the short story books Bebés jugando con cuchillos (2008) and Obituario Privado (2010), as well as numerous short stories in different anthologies and magazines.

Eximeno's works have been translated into several languages and he has won various prizes, such as the Ignotus Prize which he won 4 times, awarded to him by the Spanish Association of Fantasy, Science Fiction and Terror (AEFCFT), for his short stories and short story books.

In 2012 Eximeno created the board game Invasion (Edge, 2012) with Peter Belushi and published the book Umbría (2012).

References 

1973 births
Living people
21st-century Spanish novelists
Spanish male novelists
21st-century short story writers
Spanish male short story writers
Spanish short story writers
21st-century Spanish male writers